Pacific Sports Center is a  multi-purpose arena, in Tacoma, Washington. It served as the home turf for the Tacoma Stars of the Professional Arena Soccer League prior to 2014.

History
Between the 2011–12 and 2012–13 seasons, former Tacoma Stars team owner Marian Bowers completed construction on a new multi-sport facility to replace the team's former home, the Tacoma Soccer Center. Limited space for parking and the need for costly repairs led Bowers to build the new  Pacific Sports Center on Tacoma's south side. The privately funded complex seats up to 1,200 spectators, includes 200 parking spaces, and cost approximately $4.2 million to construct.

The center opened to the public in April 2012 with an event featuring free soccer and lacrosse clinics, facility tours, refreshments, appearances by past Tacoma Stars players, and an "official first kick" by Joe Lonergan, then Deputy Mayor of Tacoma.

References

External links
 

Sports venues completed in 2012
Buildings and structures in Pierce County, Washington
Soccer venues in Washington (state)
Tacoma Stars (2003)
2012 establishments in Washington (state)